Chris Patton is an American voice actor.

Chris Patton may also refer to:
 Chris Patton (golfer) (born 1967), American golfer
 Chris Patten (born 1944), British politician